Yasutaka Uchiyama was the defending champion but chose not to defend his title.

Marc Polmans won the title after defeating Lorenzo Giustino 6–4, 4–6, 7–6(7–4) in the final.

Seeds
All seeds receive a bye into the second round.

Draw

Finals

Top half

Section 1

Section 2

Bottom half

Section 3

Section 4

References

External links
Main draw
Qualifying draw

International Challenger Zhangjiagang - Singles
2019 Singles